Kwame Addo-Kufuor (born 14 July 1940) is a Ghanaian politician and physician. Addo-Kufuor was a member of parliament for Manhyia, and from 2001 to 2007, he was the Minister for Defence under President John Kufuor, his brother. Between June 2008 and 2009, he was the Minister for Interior.

Early life and education 
Addo-Kufuor was born on 14 July 1940. He graduated from the University of Cambridge. He holds a bachelor's degree in medicine from the university.  He also studied at the Middlesex Medical School Hospital and Jesus College.

Career 
Addo-Kufuor is a medical doctor by profession.

Political career 
Addo-Kufuor is a member of the New Patriotic Party. He became a member of parliament in January 1997 after emerging as a winner in the General Election in December 1996. He was elected once more as the member of parliament for the Manhyia constituency in the fourth parliament of the fourth Republic of Ghana.

Elections

1997 Parliamentary Elections 
Addo was first elected into Parliament during the December 1996 Ghanaian General Elections for the Manhyia Constituency in the Ashanti Region of Ghana. He polled 59,227 votes out of the 72,789 valid votes cast representing 63.30% against Yaw Addai Boadu an NDC member who polled 13,562 representing 14.50%.  He was re-elected with 64,067 votes out of the 78,368 valid votes cast representing 81.80% against Samuel B.Donkoh an NDC member who polled 12,244 votes representing 15.60%, Salifu Mumuni and PNC member who polled 1,614 votes representing 2.10% and Nana O. Boateng who polled 443 votes representing 0.60%.

2004 Parliamentary Elections 
Addo-Kufuor was elected as the member of parliament for the Bekwai constituency of the Ashanti Region of Ghana  in the 2004 Ghanaian general elections. He won on the ticket of the New Patriotic Party. His constituency was a part of the 36 parliamentary seats out of 39 seats won by the New Patriotic Party in that election for the Ashanti Region. The New Patriotic Party won a total of 128 parliamentary seats out of 230 seats.  He was elected with 66,210 votes out of 87,629 total valid votes cast. This was equivalent to 75.6% of total valid votes cast. He was elected over Salifu Mumuni of the People's National Convention, Kwame Boateng of the National Democratic Congress, E. A. Ohene Darko of the Convention People's Party, and Kofi Pervical Akpaloo an independent candidate. These obtained 667, 9,550, 498 and 10,704 votes respectively of total votes cast.4,6 These were equivalent to 0.8%, 10.9%, 0.6%  and 12.2% respectively of total valid votes cast.

Personal life 
Addo-Kufuor is a Christian.

Bibliography
Kwame Addo-Kufuor: Gold Coast Boy (A Memoir). Digibooks Ghana Ltd, 2015, .

References

External links

1940 births
Living people
People from Kumasi
New Patriotic Party politicians
Defence ministers of Ghana
Interior ministers of Ghana
Ghanaian medical doctors
Ghanaian MPs 1997–2001
Ghanaian MPs 2001–2005
Ghanaian MPs 2005–2009
Alumni of Achimota School
Alumni of Jesus College, Cambridge
Alumni of Middlesex University
Ghanaian expatriates in the United Kingdom
People from Ashanti Region